HMCS Shawinigan is a  that has served in the Canadian Forces and the Royal Canadian Navy since 1997. Shawinigan is the fifth ship of her class. She is the second vessel to use the designation . The ship is assigned to Maritime Forces Atlantic (MARLANT) and is homeported at CFB Halifax.

Design and description
The Kingston class was designed to fill the minesweeper, coastal patrol and reserve training needs of the Canadian Forces, replacing the s, s and Royal Canadian Mounted Police coastal launches in those roles. In order to perform these varied duties the Kingston-class vessels are designed to carry up to three  ISO containers with power hookups on the open deck aft in order to embark mission-specific payloads. The seven module types available for embarkation include four route survey, two mechanical minesweeping and one bottom inspection modules.

The coastal defence vessels are powered by four Jeumont ANR-53-50 alternators coupled to four Wärtsilä UD 23V12 diesel engines creating . Two LIPS Z-drive azimuth thrusters are driven by two Jeumont CI 560L motors creating  and the Z drives can be rotated 360°.

The Kingston class is equipped with a Kelvin Hughes navigational radar using the I band and a Kelvin Hughes 6000 surface search radar scanning the E and F bands. The vessels carry an AN/SQS-511 towed side scan sonar for minesweeping and a Remote-control Mine Hunting System (RMHS). The vessels are equipped with one Bofors 40 mm/60 calibre Mk 5C gun and two M2 machine guns. The 40 mm gun was declared obsolete and removed from the vessels in 2014. Some of them ended up as museum pieces and on display at naval reserve installations across Canada. The Kingston-class coastal defence vessels have a complement of 37.

Operational history

Shawinigan was laid down on 26 April 1996 by Halifax Shipyards Ltd. at Halifax, Nova Scotia, and was launched on 15 November 1996. The ship was commissioned into the Canadian Forces on 14 June 1997 at Trois Rivières, Quebec and carries the hull number MM 704. After commissioning she was assigned to Atlantic fleet. On 28 June 1998 Shawinigan took part in the 75th anniversary of the naval reserves at Halifax and was featured on a commemorative stamp issued for the event.

In August 2014, Shawinigan took part in Operation Nanook, an annual joint military exercise performed in northern Canada. During that deployment, Shawinigan set the record for traveling the furthest north of any ship in the history of the Royal Canadian Navy, reaching a maximum latitude of 80 degrees and 28 minutes north. In March 2015, as part of Operation Caribbe, Shawinigan, along with sister ship  and the US frigate , intercepted a vessel in the Caribbean Sea carrying  of cocaine.

Shawinigan and Moncton returned to Halifax on 30 September. On 22 January 2019, Shawinigan and sister ship  departed Halifax for operations off West Africa as part of Operation Projection, working with African nations as well as the United States, United Kingdom and France. The vessels returned to Halifax on 26 April.

On 26 January 2020, Shawinigan and  departed Halifax as part of Operation Projection off West Africa. Once there, the two vessels took  part in two naval exercises Obangame Express and Phoenix Express. Due to the COVID-19 pandemic, their mission was cut short and the vessels were recalled, returning to Halifax on 9 April.

In June 2021, Shawinigan was deployed to the Caribbean under the command of Cdr Bill Sanson as part of Operation Caribbe. On 18 July, the ship seized  of cocaine from a small smuggling vessel, followed by the interception of another small boat on 21 July, capturing . The ship returned to Halifax in August.

References

Notes

Citations

Sources

External links

 HMCS Shawinigan (MM 704) – official website

 

Fleet of the Royal Canadian Navy
Kingston-class coastal defence vessels
1996 ships
Ships built in Nova Scotia